Komsomolskoye mining company was founded in 1995 in Komsomolske, Donetsk Oblast. In 2011 Komsomolskoye mining company became part of the Iron Ore Division of Metinvest Group. Komsomolskoye mining company is the biggest Ukrainian supplier of limestone flux to the metallurgical and food industries. Structure of the enterprise includes three active quarries and two crushing and beneficiation factories.

See also 

 Coal in Ukraine
 List of mines in Ukraine

References

External links 
 METINVEST Iron ore division

Metinvest
Mining companies of Ukraine
Economy of Donetsk Oblast